Walter Mehring (29 April 1896 – 3 October 1981) was a German author and one of the most prominent satirical authors in the Weimar Republic. He was banned during the Third Reich and fled the country.

Early life
He was the son of the translator and writer Sigmar Mehring. His literary career began with the Sturm and Berliner Dada movements.

Early writings
He fought against militarism and antisemitism and considered himself an anarchist. He also wrote songs for some of the best cabarets in Berlin: Max Reinhardt's , Rosa Valetti's Café Größenwahn and for Trude Hesterberg's . Artists like George Grosz became close friends. From 1921 to 1928, he lived and worked in Paris.

Persecution
He was persecuted by the Nazis, particularly by Joseph Goebbels, and consequently fled the country. On 10 May 1933 his books were burnt during the Nazi book burnings.

Mehring emigrated to Vienna, where he met the actress and writer Hertha Pauli. She was his companion during his escape from the Nazis through France. He dedicated his "Briefe zur Mitternacht" ("Midnight Letters") to her. The period spent in France he also described in No Road Back. When the Nazis occupied France, he was briefly imprisoned in an internment camp. He managed to escape and, together with Hertha Pauli, he wandered around France, meeting many other people on the run from the Nazis: Franz Werfel, Alma Mahler-Werfel, Heinrich Mann, Leonhard Frank, Emil Gumbel. In Marseilles they met Varian Fry (Emergency Rescue Committee), who helped them to escape.

Exile
He emigrated to the United States. With the aid of the European Film Fund he got employment with Metro-Goldwyn-Mayer. He also wrote articles for Aufbau and became a naturalized US citizen, but never really managed to settle in the United States and returned to Europe after the war.

In Europe. he was unable to replicate his earlier successes. In 1981 he died in Zurich.

Selected works
 The Lost Library: The Autobiography of a Culture. Secker & Warburg, 1951.
 Timoshenko: Marshal of the Red Army. A. Unger, 1942.
 No Road Back. S. Curl, 1944.

See also
List of authors banned during the Third Reich

References

Critics
 Boyle, Kay: The Poetry of Walter Mehring; NO ROAD BACK, Poems by Walter Mehring, in the German text as well as English translation by S.A. de Witt. In: New York Times, 03.09.1944.
 "Walter Mehring, 85, Writer; His Sarcasm Enraged Nazis." In: New York Times, 06.10.1981. https://query.nytimes.com/gst/fullpage.html?res=990CE6DF1239F935A35753C1A967948260&scp=1&sq=mehring&st=cse
 Politzer, Heinz: "The Lost Library, by Walter Mehring." In Commentary Magazine, September 1951. http://www.commentarymagazine.com/viewarticle.cfm/the-lost-library--by-walter-mehring-1343

Literature
 Allen, Roy F.: Literary Life in German Expressionism and the Berlin Circles. UMI Research Press, 1983.
 Thomson, Philip John: The Grotesque in German Poetry, 1880–1933. Hawthorn Press, 1975.
 Spalek, John M./Bell, Robert F.: Exile, the Writer's Experience, University of North Carolina Press, 1982.

External links
 
 New York Times Obituary

1896 births
1981 deaths
Writers from Berlin
Jewish emigrants from Nazi Germany to the United States
German satirists
German Expressionist writers
German male non-fiction writers
German-language poets
People with acquired American citizenship
Dada